Depue or DePue may refer to:

Places
DePue, Illinois, a village in Bureau County
Depue, West Virginia, an unincorporated community in Roane County

Other
David A. Depue (1826–1902), Justice of the Supreme Court of New Jersey
Roger Depue (fl. 1970s–2000s), a veteran of the Federal Bureau of Investigation (FBI)